Nicholas Marcus Thompson Et Al V. His Majesty The King (T-1458-20) is a landmark case known as the Black Class Action filed with the Federal Court of Canada on December 2, 2020. The $2.5-billion claim filed by both current and former Black public servants seeks damages for "the unjust practice of Black employee exclusion due to systemic discrimination" dating back to the 1970s. The Black Class Action is a registered non-for-profit organization that is coordinating the legal action.

Background

In June 2020, Canadian Prime Minister Justin Trudeau, acknowledged that systemic discrimination existed in all institutions. Nicholas Marcus Thompson is a social justice advocate and a union leader in Canada. Mr Thompson is the organiser and lead plaintiff of the Black Class Action lawsuit against the federal government for systemic workplace discrimination against Black Canadians.

Mr Thompson advocated for measures to address anti-Black discrimination at the Canada Revenue Agency. He lobbied the Minister of National Revenue, Dianne Lebouthiller, the Clerk Of the Privy Council Ian Shuggart and Prime Minister Justin Trudeau. Mr Thompson then organized Black workers from various federal public sector institutions including the Canada Revenue Agency, Canadian Human Rights Commission, the Royal Canadian Mounted Police and Public Prosecution Service of Canada and filed the $900 million class-action lawsuit against the entire federal public service. Former crown attorney Courtney Betty is leading the legal team representing the plaintiffs.

The Statement of Claim was amended on May 13, 2021. The amended claim proposes an increase in reparations, from $900-million to $2.5-billion, to cover losses in income, opportunities, and pension values and other benefits stemming from a lack of promotion for Black employees within the public service.

Following the filing of the lawsuit on December 2, 2020, the Clerk of the Privy Council Ian Shuggart issued a call to action on January 22, 2021, on Anti-racism, equity, and inclusion in the Federal Public Service. The Clerk called on public service leaders to appoint, sponsor and support Black workers as well as Indigenous and other underrepresented groups.

In the 2021 budget, the government amended the Public Service Employment Act aimed at removing barriers to hiring and promotions. Treasury Board spokesperson Martin Potvin said this was one of the steps the government has taken to tackle systemic discrimination in the federal workforce. 

The 2021 budget also committed $250 million over five years to collect disaggregated data.

Following national protests in Canada after the murder of George Floyd in the United States and Black Canadians in Canada, heightened awareness was raised on anti-Black discrimination in Canada.

What the claim seeks
The systemic discrimination class action lawsuit asks the federal government to adopt a policy that ensures the number of Black employees is representative of the percentage of Black people in the general population and that they are represented at all levels of employment. The claim further requests that a compensation fund be established, alongside a Black Equity Commission that will serve to implement solutions on addressing institutional discrimination.

Mental Health Fund 
On July 9, 2021 the group filed a motion in the Federal Court to order an interim mental health fund of at least $100 million for current and former Black employees who require immediate support for trauma they've faced working in the public service. Representative plaintiff Nicholas Marcus Thompson said "damages that Black workers have faced and continue to face, it's real and it's ongoing" and that "some of our class members have shared that they've had suicidal attempts. They've thought about ending their life because it has become so challenging, so difficult to show up for work every day."

In the same month, organizations including the Federation of Black Canadians, Black North Initiative, Black Health Alliance, Taibu Community Health Centre and the Professional Institute of the Public Service of Canada issued a call to action to the Prime Minister of Canada calling for the establishment of a mental health program to address to unique challenges that Black public service workers face due to systemic discrimination.

On August 31, 2021 leader of the Liberal Party of Canada Justin Trudeau announced if his party is re-elected, the government would set up a fund for Black public servants’ mental health, which is a response to the class-action lawsuit

On December 16, 2021 Prime Minister Justin Trudeau turned the campaign promise into government policy by issuing a mandate to the president of the Treasury Board to "Establishing a mental health fund for Black public servants and supporting career advancement, training, sponsorship and educational opportunities"

Media reports from December 2022 indicated that this fund was in jeopardy as Black civil servants working on mental health program accused the Treasury Board Secretariat of racism.

Employment Equity Act 
The statement of claim alleges that the Employment Equity Act violates the Charter of Rights of Black employees and that it has failed to break down the category of “visible minorities,” ignoring the unique racism faced by Black employees. The plaintiffs are seeking an amendment to the Act to create a separate category for Black workers. Representative Plaintiff Nicholas Marcus Thompson said “one of the most important changes the government can make right now is to amend the Employment Equity Act and create a separate category for Black workers — apart from the ‘visible minority’ category,” which would “allow federal employers, and employers regulated by the federal government, to directedly address underrepresentation issues for Black workers.” 

On July 14, 2021 the Government of Canada announced the 13-members task force lead by Professor Adelle Blackett, to conduct the most expansive review of the Act since its inception.

UN Human Rights Complaint 

The Black Class Action Secretariat has formally filed a complaint against the federal government on behalf of Black civil servants with the United Nations Human Rights Council. "With this complaint, we are elevating Canada's past failures and failure to act in the present to an international body." said Nicholas Marcus Thompson.  The Treasury Board president Mona Fortier responded to the complaint stating that "the Government of Canada is actively working to address harms and create a diverse and inclusive public service free of discrimination and harassment. Our workforce must be representative of the communities we serve, our federal workplaces should be welcoming, safe and supportive environments."

References

Law of Canada
Federal Court of Canada
Discrimination in Canada
Non-profit corporations